"As I laye a-thynkynge" is the last poem written by "Thomas Ingoldsby" (Richard Barham).  It was set to music by the English composer Edward Elgar.

The song was published in 1888 by Beare & Son, though may have been written in the previous year.  It is a song for soprano or tenor.

Lyrics
Elgar omitted the two verses enclosed in square brackets [ ] – the fifth and sixth verses of the poem.

AS I LAYE A-THYNKYNGE
 
As I laye a-thynkynge, a-thynkynge, a-thynkynge,
Merrie sang the Birde as she sat upon the spraye!
There came a noble Knyghte,
With his hauberke shynynge brighte,
And his gallant heart was lyghte,
Free and gaye;
As I laye a-thynkynge, he rode upon his waye.

As I laye a-thynkynge, a-thynkynge, a-thynkynge,
Sadly sang the Birde as she sat upon the tree!
There seemed a crimson plain,
Where a gallant Knyghte lay slayne,
And a steed with broken rein
Ran free,
As I laye a-thynkynge, most pitiful to see!

As I laye a-thynkynge, a-thynkynge, a-thynkynge,
Merrie sang the Birde as she sat upon the boughe;
A lovely Mayde came by,
And a gentil youth was nyghe,
And he breathed many a syghe
And a vowe;
As I laye a-thynkynge, her heart was gladsome now.

As I laye a-thynkynge, a-thynkynge, a-thynkynge,
Sadly sang the Birde as she sat upon the thorne;
No more a youth was there,
But a Maiden rent her haire,
And cried out in sad despaire,
'That I was borne!'
As I laye a-thynkynge, she perished forlorne.

[ As I laye a-thynkynge, a-thynkynge, a-thynkynge,
Sweetly sang the Birde as she sat upon the briar;
There came a lovely Childe,
And his face was meek and mild,
Yet joyously he smiled
On his sire;
As I laye a-thynkynge, a Cherub mote admire.

But I laye a-thynkynge, a-thynkynge, a-thynkynge,
And sadly sang the Birde as it perch'd upon a bier;
That joyous smile was gone,
And that face was white and wan,
As the downe upon the Swan
Doth appear
As I laye a-thynkynge - oh! bitter flow'd the tear! ]

As I laye a-thynkynge the golden sun was sinking,
O merrie sang that Birde as it glittered on her breast
With a thousand gorgeous dyes,
While soaring to the skies,
'Mid the stars she seem'd to rise,
As to her nest;
As I laye a-thynkynge, her meaning was exprest:-
'Follow, follow me away,
It boots not to delay,'-
'Twas so she seem'd to saye,
'HERE IS REST!'
T. I.

Notes

References

Banfield, Stephen, Sensibility and English Song: Critical studies of the early 20th century (Cambridge University Press, 1985) 
Kennedy, Michael, Portrait of Elgar (Oxford University Press, 1968)

External links

Recordings
Songs and Piano Music by Edward Elgar Premiere recording of "As I laye a-thynkynge" performed by Amanda Pitt (soprano), with David Owen Norris (piano).

Songs by Edward Elgar
1888 songs